Pipedreams is a radio music program produced and distributed by American Public Media (APM) based in Saint Paul, Minnesota, created and hosted since its inception by J. Michael Barone.

History
Each one or two-hour show features organ music, and centers on a theme such as a particular instrument, venue, organ builder, performer, composer, period, etc. The program has been in weekly national broadcast syndication since 1983 (following pilot episodes in 1982), and it remains the only nationally syndicated radio program in the United States devoted to organ music. The program is available on APM-affiliated stations and on the Pipedreams.org website. In recent years, Pipedreams''' weekly radio audience has fluctuated around 200,000 listeners. The program's major sponsors include the Associated Pipe Organ Builders of America. In addition to the radio program itself, Pipedreams is also known for producing guided tours, often to Europe with the objective of visiting organs of unique quality or interest. Recordings of these notable instruments are frequently featured in the broadcasts of Pipedreams.

Accolades
The program's major accolades include the 2001 Deems Taylor Radio Broadcast Award for Excellence from the American Society of Composers, Authors and Publishers.

 In popular culture 
The program was referenced on Episode 116 (Santa Claus) of the cult TV series Mystery Science Theater 3000'' in 1993.

References

External links
 Pipedreams.org official website

American classical music radio programs
American Public Media programs
Pipe organ
1982 radio programme debuts